For the state competition affiliated with Miss Florida, see Miss Florida's Outstanding Teen

The Miss Florida's Teen competition is the competition that selects the representative for the U.S. state of Florida in the Miss America's Teen competition.

Aashna Shah of Wekiva Springs was crowned Miss Florida's Outstanding Teen on June 25, 2022 at the Youkey Theater in Lakeland, Florida. She competed for the title of Miss America's Outstanding Teen 2023 at the Hyatt Regency Dallas in Dallas, Texas on August 12, 2022.

In January of 2023, the official name of the pageant was changed from Miss Florida’s Outstanding Teen, to Miss Florida’s Teen, in accordance with the national pageant.

Results summary 
The following is a visual summary of the past results of Miss Florida's Outstanding Teen titleholders presented in the table below. The year in parentheses indicates year of the Miss America's Outstanding Teen competition in which the placement and/or award was garnered.

Placements
 Miss America's Outstanding Teen: Elizabeth Fechtel (2012), Leah Sykes (2014)
 2nd runners-up: Myrrhanda Jones (2010)
 3rd runners-up: Sierra Minott (2006), Anjelica Jones (2017)
 Top 9: Reece Weaver (2018)
 Top 10: Alexandra Milbrath (2008)
 Top 12: Michaela McLean (2015), Jessica Sales (2019)

Awards

Preliminary awards
 Preliminary Evening Wear/On Stage Question: Sierra Minott (2006), Myrrhanda Jones (2010)
 Preliminary Talent: Anjelica Jones (2017)

Other awards

 Miss Photogenic: Mary Katherine Fechtel (2011)
 Outstanding Dance Award: Michaela McLean (2015), Anjelica Jones (2017), Reece Weaver (2018)
 Non-finalist Talent Award: Mary Katherine Fechtel (2011)
 Teens in Action Award Winners: Hannah Adams (2020) 
 Teens in Action Award Finalists: Leah Roddenberry (2016), Ruby Tilghman (2022)
Overall Dance Award: Jessica Sales (2019)

Winners

References

External links
 Official website

Florida
Florida culture
Women in Florida
Annual events in Florida